Ren & Stimpy "Adult Party Cartoon" is an adult animated television series created by Canadian animator John Kricfalusi for the cable network Spike TV. The series was developed as an "extreme" revamp and spin-off/reboot of The Ren & Stimpy Show, which previously aired on the American cable network Nickelodeon, and is significantly more vulgar than the original series. The series premiered on June 26, 2003, and was removed from the network on July 24, after airing only three episodes; the remaining episodes were released on DVD. During its run, Adult Party Cartoon was heavily panned by critics and fans of the original show. It has been referred to as one of the worst animated series of all time.

History
The original Ren & Stimpy Show premiered alongside Rugrats and Doug as one of the original Nicktoons on children's network Nickelodeon in 1991. The show's creator, John Kricfalusi, had many altercations with the network, eventually culminating in his termination. In 2002, about a decade after Kricfalusi's termination, Viacom (which owns Nickelodeon) contacted him to produce a new version of his series for an updated version of TNN, Spike TV, which was devoted to programming for male audiences. Kricfalusi said that TNN wanted an "extreme" version of The Ren & Stimpy Show. TNN gave Kricfalusi greater control of the writing and contents of the episodes, and he produced six new episodes aimed at adult audiences. As in the original series, Kricfalusi ran into problems with meeting production deadlines, with only three out of the nine episodes ordered by the network being completed on time.

Some of the original voice cast members returned, with the exception of Billy West, original voice of Stimpy and second voice of Ren and Mr. Horse, who turned down the role, as he did not consider it funny and felt that participating in it would’ve damaged his career. Eric Bauza was hired to replace West as Stimpy, while Kricfalusi reprised his roles as Ren and Mr. Horse. Cast members Harris Peet and Cheryl Chase also returned, and Kricfalusi's father Mike Kricfalusi and long-time childhood friend Tom Hay provided some voices.

The new series began airing in June 2003 as part of an animation block also featuring Gary the Rat, Stripperella, and digitally remastered episodes of the original Ren & Stimpy series, subtitled "Digitally Remastered Classics". Kricfalusi wrote the first episode, "Onward and Upward", based on requests from fans from the Nickelodeon era. The episode portrayed the characters as bisexual. Advertisers objected to some of the new show's content, particularly that of the risqué episode "Naked Beach Frenzy" which did not air in the show's original run, causing trouble with scheduling. The show stopped airing after three episodes when TNN's animation block was "put on hold".

The remaining episodes were set to resume in August 2004 along with the premiere of Spike's new animated series Immigrants but both shows were pulled and never aired again.

Kricfalusi shut down Spümcø shortly on July 18, 2005, thereafter following a lawsuit filed by Carbunkle Cartoons for failing to pay the animation studio for their services. In 2005, he announced that all of the Adult Party Cartoon episodes that were fully produced were coming to DVD, which was released on July 18, 2006.

Episodes
All episodes of the series were directed by series creator John Kricfalusi, credited as "John K." for the first five episodes and "M. John Kricfalusi" for the final episode.

Unfinished episodes
 Life Sucks – Ren explains to Stimpy that life sucks, much to Stimpy's horror. After that, they have an extensive look at life's past tragedies like the Children's Crusade. According to John Kricfalusi, this was going to be the prequel episode to "Ren Seeks Help". This was the cause of Ren and Stimpy's argument, as it is never stated in "Ren Seeks Help" what Ren had done exactly. Production had begun on this episode, with some voice work and roughly a third of the storyboard completed at the time of the show's cancellation. This episode was also originally written for Nickelodeon.
 The Big Switch – The sequel to "Ren Seeks Help", with it beginning with Stimpy no longer tolerating Ren's abuse any longer as the two argue over which is better by being an idiot or a "psychotic asshole". They finally settle the argument by making a bet that they can switch roles for a day. The episode's basic premise would somewhat be loosely made into the Games Animation-era episode "Who's Stupid Now?".
 Fishing Trip – Ren and Stimpy go on a fishing trip in search of the elusive foul-mouthed bass. The episode's basic premise is loosely related to the season 3 episode "Bass Masters" and the unproduced Spümcø episode "The Wilderness Adventure".
 The Wilderness Adventure – George Liquor takes Ren and Stimpy hunting in the deep woods. The episode was originally written for Nickelodeon, but was rejected several times. Michael Pataki was made to reprise his role as George Liquor. The storyboard for the rejected episode, however, was completed all the way back in the 90s, as far as before the show actually started production, as one of the ideas would later be used in the season 2 episode "The Great Outdoors". Two small portions of some of the storyboards of this episode had some voice work, sound effects and music completed, and put into part of the episode before the show's cancellation.
 Untitled Shampoo Master Episode – The character named Shampoo Master first appeared in Naked Beach Frenzy, and Kricfalusi was planning on making an entire episode dedicated to him.
 Untitled Mike Barrier Episode – Kricfalusi offered to make a cartoon based on what animation historian Mike Barrier thought would make a good cartoon, but then stopped corresponding.
 Untitled Father Episode – Another episode was going to be about the specific tastes and phobias of Kricfalusi's father. The episode was left unfinished.

Unfinished segments
 My Little Ass – A fake commercial that parodies the My Little Pony franchise. The script for the commercial was written during when Kricfalusi was working on the new episodes for Spike, but it never came to fruition. (Source: John K. Interview - 08/19/03, WGN Radio)
 Powdered Toast Man's Rolling Tobacco – A second fake commercial. The commercial was going to mark the return of Powdered Toast Man. The idea for the commercial was conceived, but the commercial itself was never fully produced. (Source: John K. Interview - 08/19/03, WGN Radio)
 Log for Moms – A third fake commercial. This commercial was going to be about a log specifically targeted to mothers. This commercial was planned, but it was never completed.

Broadcast and DVD release
The episode "Man's Best Friend" was originally set to air in the original series' second season, but the episode was rejected by Nickelodeon due to disturbing violence a brief joke about Feces and references to tobacco. The episode did not air on television until 2003. TNN's official episode lineup on their website seemed to suggest that they consider the episode Man's Best Friend a part of the Ren & Stimpy "Adult Party Cartoon" series, but this episode in general is not counted as one of the three episodes from this series that did air in the U.S. The first new episode that aired on TNN was Onward and Upward, and Ren Seeks Help was the second. The episode Fire Dogs 2 was the last episode to air on TNN. The three episodes Naked Beach Frenzy, Altruists, and Stimpy's Pregnant did not originally air on TNN, though they did air on other networks overseas, including Fox in Italy and MTV in Poland. They were also included in the Ren & Stimpy: The Lost Episodes DVD set that was released in 2006.

Reception 
DVD Talk panned the series, writing, "Even with a few bright spots [...] [Ren & Stimpy "Adult Party Cartoon" is] a mostly dismal affair that will sharply divide fans of the series."

PopMatters was more favorable, writing: "With snot as side dishes and vomit as gravy, the foulness is overwhelming, yet also clever. Kricfalusi's satire may be obvious, but he's not just making puke jokes for nausea's sake."

See also

 "Man's Best Friend" (The Ren & Stimpy Show)

References

External links

 

Adult Party Cartoon
2000s American adult animated television series
2000s American animated comedy television series
2000s American parody television series
2000s American sitcoms
2003 American television series debuts
2006 American television series endings
2000s Canadian adult animated television series
2000s Canadian animated comedy television series
2000s Canadian sitcoms
2003 Canadian television series debuts
2003 Canadian television series endings
American adult animated comedy television series
American adult animated television spin-offs
American animated sitcoms
Canadian adult animated comedy television series
Canadian animated sitcoms
Canadian animated television spin-offs
Canadian parody television series
English-language television shows
Spike (TV network) original programming
Spümcø
Animated television series reboots
Television series created by John Kricfalusi